Jim Williams (born 8 December 1968) is a former international rugby union player and coach. He was most recently assistant coach to the Australian national rugby union team. Williams has been head coach of the Greater Sydney Rams in the National Rugby Championship since 2015, succeeding Brian Melrose

Early life 
Born in Young, New South Wales, Williams played rugby league as a boy. He began rugby union after joining the army at age 17. He played for Young RFC, then moved to Brisbane where he played for Wests Bulldogs.

West Hartlepool, England
Williams moved to England in 1994 and played one season with West Hartlepool.

Australian rugby
On returning to Australia, Williams played Sydney club rugby while remaining on the fringes of the NSW Waratahs team. It wasn't until he changed to the back row that he was able to find enough form to be picked up by Eddie Jones at the ACT Brumbies in 1998. It was his form playing for the Brumbies that led to his selection for the Australian squad for the 1999 Rugby World Cup.

Munster & Ireland 
After missing Wallabies selection in 2001, Williams accepted a two-year deal with Munster, and soon captained the Irish club. He played 30 Heineken Cup matches for Munster, and scored 15 points. Williams played until 2005 when he was appointed assistant coach.

Wallabies assistant coach 
He continued in coaching roles at Munster until 2008 when new Wallabies coach Robbie Deans offered him the Assistant Coach role. At the start of Australia's international rugby season in June 2008 Williams took up his new role alongside fellow assistant Michael Foley.
Williams left the Wallabies in 2011.

References 

Munster Rugby players
Munster Rugby captains
Munster Rugby non-playing staff
Australian rugby union players
Australia international rugby union players
Australia international rugby sevens players
Australian rugby union coaches
Footballers who switched code
Indigenous Australian rugby union players
ACT Brumbies players
Rugby union flankers
1968 births
Living people
Commonwealth Games medallists in rugby sevens
Male rugby sevens players
Commonwealth Games bronze medallists for Australia
Commonwealth Games rugby sevens players of Australia
Rugby sevens players at the 1998 Commonwealth Games
People from Young, New South Wales
Rugby union players from New South Wales
Medallists at the 1998 Commonwealth Games